Yasir Ali Butt (born 3 July 1988 in Lahore, Pakistan) is a professional squash player who represented Pakistan. He reached a Professional Squash Association (PSA) ranking No. 40 in  the world in July 2008. and Super Series ranking No. 17 in 2012. In 2011

Butt represented Pakistan at both the Commonwealth Games in New Delhi, India. At the Asian Games in Guangzhou, China he was part of the gold medal winning team.

Accomplishments 
 Career's best Professional Squash Association (PSA) ranking 40 and super series ranking 17
 Finalist of World Junior Open Squash Championship 2004 singles event 
 Winner of World Junior Open Squash Championship 2004 team event 
 Finalist of Asian Junior Open Squash Championship 2003 singles event 
 Winner of Asian Junior Open Squash Championship 2003 team event 
 Winner of British Junior Open Squash Championship 2003 U-17 category 
 Winner of British Junior Open Squash Championship 2002 U-15 category 
 Winner of Scottish Junior Open Squash Championship 2002 U-15 category 
 Winner of National Junior Championships of U-14, U-15, U-16, U-17 & U-19 categories. 
 Represented Pakistan in World Squash Team Championship, World Open, British Open, Malaysian 
 Open, Hong Kong Open, Asian and Commonwealth Games
 Semi Final of Florida State Open 2011 (USA)
 Winner of Gold Racquet Tournament 2011 (USA) 
 Finalist of Dayton Open 2011 (USA) 
 Winner of FMC International Squash Championship 2011 (Pakistan) 
 Finalist 3RD Kish Persian Gulf Cup 2011 (Iran)
 Finalist Pakistan International Squash Championship 2011 (Pakistan) 
 Finalist Taiwan Open 2008 (Taiwan) 
 Finalist President International Squash Championship 2008 (Pakistan) 
 Finalist COAS International Squash Championship 2008 (Pakistan) 
 Finalist Fajr International Squash Championship 2008 (Pakistan) 
 Semifinalist of Manitoba Open 2008 Canada 
 Gold medallist in Asian Games 2010, Guangzhou, China
 Gold medallist in SAF Games 2006 held at Colombo, Sri Lanka 
 Gold medallist in National Team Championship 2006 held at Islamabad, Pakistan

References

External links 
 
 
 

1988 births
Living people
Pakistani male squash players
Commonwealth Games competitors for Pakistan
Squash players at the 2010 Commonwealth Games
Asian Games medalists in squash
Asian Games gold medalists for Pakistan
Squash players at the 2010 Asian Games
Medalists at the 2010 Asian Games
Racket sportspeople from Lahore
21st-century Pakistani people